The Women's individual recurve open archery discipline at the 2016 Summer Paralympics was contested  from September 10 to September 15. Ranking rounds took place on 10 September, while knockout rounds continued on September 15.

In the ranking rounds each archer shot 72 arrows, and was seeded according to score. In the knock-out stages each archer shot three arrows per set against an opponent, scoring two points for a won set and one for a draw. Matches were won by the first archer to six points. Losing semifinalists competed in a bronze medal match.

Ranking Round
PR = Paralympic Record.

Knockout stage

Finals

Section 1

Section 2

Section 3

Section 4

References

Women's individual recurve open
Para